Compsomantis tumidiceps is a species of praying mantis found in Java, Lombok, the Philippine Islands, Sumatra, Sumba, and Timor.

References

Compsomantis
Insects of Timor
Insects described in 1923